Dark moon describes the Moon during that time that it is invisible against the backdrop of the Sun in the sky.

Dark moon (or Dark Moon) may also refer to:
"Dark Moon" (song), a 1957 song written by Ned Miller
Dark moon, sometimes refers to Lilith (hypothetical moon), Earth's hypothetical second moon
Luigi's Mansion: Dark Moon, the sequel to Luigi's Mansion for the Nintendo 3DS and its titular object, the Dark Moon

See also
Dark Side of the Moon (disambiguation)